Maldera is a surname. Notable people with the surname include:

Aldo Maldera (1953–2012), Italian footballer
Luigi Maldera (1946–2021), Italian footballer